Narenjbon-e Pain (also Romanized as Nārenjbon-e Pā’īn; also known as Nārenj Bon) is a village in Otaqvar Rural District, Otaqvar District, Langarud County, Gilan Province, Iran. At the 2006 census, its population was 105, in 27 families.

References 

Populated places in Langarud County